Zatar may refer to:
the Middle Eastern spice mixture Za'atar
Zatar, a character on Weird TV, also known as the Mutant King